The siege of Terabe Castle took place in 1558 in feudal Japan. Terabe Castle was a possession of the Ogasawara clan of Mikawa province. The Siege of Terabe Castle was Matsudaira Motoyasu's first battle, who would later change his name to Tokugawa Ieyasu.

History 
The castle was built on the north shore of Mikawa Bay, in what is now called Hazu, in the city of Nishio, Aichi Prefecture.
In 1558, Suzuki Shigeteru, lord of Terabe Castle, defected from the Imagawa in favor of an alliance with Oda Nobunaga. The Imagawa responded by sending an army under the command of Matsudaira Motoyasu, a young vassal of Imagawa Yoshimoto. Terabe Castle was the first of a series of battles waged against the Oda clan.

Motoyasu's forces attacked Terabe Castle, but were driven off by reinforcements sent by Oda Nobunaga. Motoyasu then continued his campaign against other Oda clan possessions.

References

 

1558 in Japan
Terabe 1558
Terabe 1558